Alexander David Linz (born November 3, 1989) is an American former child actor who starred in several late 1990s and early 2000s films and television series. His film roles include Home Alone 3 (1997) and Max Keeble's Big Move (2001). He retired from acting in 2007.

Early life 
Linz was born in Santa Barbara, California, the son of Deborah Baltaxe, an attorney, and Dr. Daniel Linz, a professor of Communication at the University of California, Santa Barbara. His parents are divorced, and he lived with his mother. He has two younger sisters named Lily Alice and Livia. Linz is of Jewish faith, and had a Bar Mitzvah ceremony.

He attended Alexander Hamilton High School in Los Angeles during which time he was the lead singer of a local garage band named "The Fez Armada". After he graduated from the University of California, Berkeley, where he was a member of the improvisation and sketch comedy group, jericho!, Linz received a master's degree in Urban and Regional Planning at UCLA in 2017.

Career 
Linz made his acting debut in 1995 on an episode of the television series Cybill. He subsequently appeared in several television productions, played Phillip Chancellor IV on the soap opera The Young and the Restless in 1995 for a short period of time, and was cast as the son of Michelle Pfeiffer's character in the 1996 film One Fine Day. His first big breakthrough came in the 1997 Christmas film, Home Alone 3, but the film got a lukewarm reception due to lacking a reprising cast that represented the McCallister family. In 2001, Linz played the title character in the Disney film Max Keeble's Big Move which received mixed reviews and was a box office failure.

Filmography

Film

References

External links 

1989 births
Living people
20th-century American Jews
20th-century American male actors
21st-century American Jews
21st-century American male actors
Alexander Hamilton High School (Los Angeles) alumni
American male child actors
American male film actors
American male television actors
American male voice actors
Film directors from California
Film producers from California
Jewish American male actors
Male actors from Santa Barbara, California
University of California, Berkeley alumni
Disney people